Bruce Richard Stewart (5 August 1936 – 28 June 2017) was a New Zealand fiction writer and dramatist of Ngāti Raukawa Te Arawa descent. Stewart's work often expresses the anger, the confused loyalties, and the spiritual aspirations of late-twentieth-century Māori.

Biography
Stewart was born in Hamilton. His pakeha biological father had no involvement with him, and his Maori mother Molly Daphne Hirini has said that her Tainui tribe frowned on mixed-race children. Stewart got his name from his stepfather Donald Lewis Stewart, who married Molly Hirini in 1938. Molly died in 1954. Stewart grew up in Masterton and was educated at Wairarapa College.

He lived mainly in Wellington, where he successfully set up the first work trust and founded Tapu Te Ranga Marae at Island Bay, creating a centre for debate and education in Māori culture and protocol and for the redevelopment of native bush. He was president of Nga Puna Waihanga (Maori Writers and Artists Society) in 1982.

Stewart died at Tapu Te Ranga on 28 June 2017.

Published and televised
Broken Arse was published in Into the World of Light (1982) and Stewart later rewrote it as a playscript, which was performed in Wellington in 1990, televised and published by Victoria University Press in 1991. In that dramatic form, the strength of the rebellious prisoners stomping and chanting in unison became even more powerful as haka.

Books

 Tama, and Other Stories Auckland : Penguin, 1989.
Reviewed by;
Eggleton, David. Evening Post p.31; 27 May 1989.
Mackrell, Brian. New Zealand Wildlife 11(88):32; Spring 1989.
King, Michael. Metro 9(96):184–186; June 1989.
Taylor, Apirana. Dominion Sunday Times p.17; 4 June 1989.
Duggan, Sally. NZ Herald 2:6; 19 Aug 1989.
Faith, Rangi. Listener 124(2572):71; 24 June 1989.Z
McEldowney, W.J.. Otago Daily Times p.24; 5 July 1989.
 Broken Arse Wellington : Victoria University Press, 1991.
Reviewed by;
Dale, Judith. New Zealand Books 1(4):8; March 1992.
Cooke, Patricia. Dominion Sunday Times p.20; 29 Sep 1991.

Performance
Reviews of performance at Depot Theatre
Evening Post p.24; 26 Feb 1990.
Budd, Susan. Dominion p.11; 6 Mar 1990.
Cooke, Patricia. Dominion Sunday Times p.18; 11 Mar 1990.
Welch, Denis. Listener 128(2634):108; 10 Sep 1990.

Review
 The author discusses his play;
"Broken Arse on at Depot". Evening Post. p.24; 26 Feb 1990.
 Autobiographical.
 "Ko wai ahau?" Mana : the Maori news magazine for all New Zealanders. 1:94–95; Jan/Feb 1993.
Interview with Stewart, Neville Glasgow, Directions (1995).

Related published material
McLauchlan, Gordon. 'A new beginning for Maori writing?'  Auckland Metro 10:21; April 1982.
Galloway, Penny. 'Waitangi writings.'  Listener 120(2502):8; 6 Feb 1988. Includes comment on Stewart.
McNaughton, Iona. 'Tales of an angry young Maori.' Dominion p.10; 27 May 1989.
O'Hare, N. 'Faith and work.'  Listener 125(2594) Sup.p.85-87; 20 Nov 1989. Interview.
Lucas, J. 'Stewart's marae threatened.'  Evening Post p.1,3; 25 May 1991.
Wevers, Lydia. 'Short fiction by Maori writers.'  Commonwealth : Essays and Studies 16(2):26–33; Spring, ::1994. Includes comment on Bruce Stewart.
Donaldson, Lana Simmons. 'Willing to conform only to nature.'  Kia Hiwa Ra : National Maori Newspaper 58:8, 24; Nov 1997. Profile.
Heim, Otto. Writing Along Broken Lines: Violence and Ethnicity in Contemporary Maori Fiction. Auckland: ::Auckland University Press, 1998.
Collins, Heeni. 'Heroes on the hill.' Evening Post p.13  25 Sep 1999. Discusses statue erected by Stewart ::on Tawatawa Ridge, Island Bay, of Te Rauparaha and Te Rangihaeata.

See also
 Te Raekaihau Point
 Te Rangihaeata
 Te Rauparaha
 Nga Puna Waihanga
 Tapu Te Ranga Marae

References

External links
 New Zealand Book Council

1936 births
2017 deaths
Ngāti Raukawa people
Te Arawa people
People from Hamilton, New Zealand
People educated at Wairarapa College
New Zealand writers